Waisa is a village in the Chhachh Valley in Pakistan, a geographical region in the northern section of Attock District, to the east of Peshawar, and west of Islamabad.

Geography
The village was geographically situated in the Attock District within one mile of the south side of the Indus River.
Waisa neighbours the villages of Kamalpur Moosa in the east, Tajak on the southern side, Shadi Khan in the west, and Sirka Village towards the north west. The capital city of Pakistan, Islamabad, is located 60 miles east of Waisa.

References

Villages in Attock District